Callum Fordyce (born 23 June 1992) is a Scottish professional footballer who plays as a centre-back, and is a player-assistant manager for Airdrieonians. Fordyce started his career as a youth player with Hibernian and Livingston, before signing with the Lions on a permanent senior contract, before going on to play for Dunfermline Athletic and Queen of the South. Fordyce also had a loan spell at Clyde whilst at the West Lothian club.

Career

Livingston
Fordyce joined Livingston's youth system from Hibernian in 2009. A member of the Lions under-19s, Fordyce made his senior debut on 23 April 2011, playing from the start in a 4–2 win versus Airdrie United in the Scottish Second Division. Fordyce made two more appearances that season. Fordyce's next appearance was in the following season on 2 January 2011 as a substitute versus Falkirk in the Scottish First Division. On 15 March 2013, Fordyce moved to Clyde on a short-term loan deal  and made six appearances in total. Fordyce extended his stay with Livingston by signing a new one-year contract in May 2013.

Dunfermline Athletic
In June 2015, after six years with Livingston, Fordyce signed for Scottish League One club Dunfermline Athletic and was appointed first-team captain by manager Allan Johnston. On 12 September 2015 in a match versus Scottish League One club Ayr United, Fordyce was injured in a tackle by Ayr striker Craig Moore, suffering a suspected broken leg. Fordyce was released by the Pars at the end of the 2016–17 season, as his contract expired.

Queen of the South
On 23 May 2017, Fordyce signed a one-year contract with fellow Scottish Championship club Queen of the South.

On 1 February 2018, Fordyce signed an extension to his contract to remain in Dumfries until May 2019.

Airdrieonians
On 30 May 2019, Fordyce signed a one-year contract with Scottish League One club Airdrieonians.

On 26 May 2022, Fordyce was named as player-assistant manager of Airdrieonians alongside player-manager Rhys McCabe.

Career statistics

Personal life
Fordyce's cousin Rhys McCabe, is also a professional footballer; the two play together at Airdrieonians and previously played alongside each other at Dunfermline Athletic.

On 2 November 2018 Fordyce and his wife Zoe became parents for the first time when their daughter, Billie arrived weighing 8 pounds.

Honours

Club
Livingston 
2015 Scottish Challenge Cup
Dunfermline Athletic
Scottish League One: 2015–16

References

External links
 

1992 births
Living people
Scottish footballers
Association football central defenders
Cowdenbeath F.C. players
Livingston F.C. players
Dunfermline Athletic F.C. players
Queen of the South F.C. players
Scottish Football League players
Sportspeople from Livingston, West Lothian
Footballers from West Lothian
Scottish Professional Football League players
Hibernian F.C. players
Airdrieonians F.C. players